Hydrocortisone butyrate is a corticosteroid that comes in one of the following forms:
 Hydrocortisone-17-butyrate — 
 Hydrocortisone-21-butyrate — 

It is a group IV corticosteroid under US classification.

See also
 Cortisol

External links
 

Butyrate esters
Corticosteroids